Morgridge is a surname. Notable people with the surname include:

Carrie Morgridge (born 1967), American philanthropist and author, daughter-in-law of John
John Morgridge (born 1933), American businessman, former CEO of Cisco Systems